Year 1325 (MCCCXXV) was a common year starting on Tuesday (link will display the full calendar) of the Julian calendar.

Events 
 January–December 
 January 7 – Afonso IV becomes King of Portugal.
 February – Muhammad bin Tughluq succeeds his father Ghiyath al-Din Tughluq, as Sultan of Delhi.
 July – War of the Bucket breaks out: Modena makes incursions into the territory of Bologna.
 November 15 – Battle of Zappolino: Modena defeats Bologna.

 Date unknown 
 The town of Bolu is conquered by the Ottoman Empire.
 Ibn Battuta begins his travels.
 Mansa Musa completes his pilgrimage to Mecca.
 Recognized year of the founding of the Aztec capital Tenochtitlan on a small island in Lake Texcoco by the Mexica. It becomes Mexico City in 1521.

Births 
 May 12 – Rupert II, Elector Palatine (d. 1398)
 date unknown 
 John Wycliffe, English "Morning star of the Reformation" (d. 1384)
 Hafiz al-Iraqi, Islamic scholar (d. 1403)
 Inês de Castro, lover of King Pedro I of Portugal (d. 1355)
 Margaret the Barefooted, Italian saint (d. 1395)
 Matthew Kantakouzenos, Emperor of Byzantium
 Pandolfo II Malatesta, Italian condottiero (d. 1373)
 probable – Francesco Landini, Florentine organist and composer (d. 1397)

Deaths 
 January 7 – King Dinis of Portugal (b. 1261)
 April 3 – Nizamuddin Auliya, Sufi saint (b. 1238)
 June 6 or July 6 – Ismail I, Sultan of Granada (b. 1279) (assassinated)
 November 21 – Yury of Moscow, Prince of Moscow and Vladimir
 December 16 – Charles, Count of Valois, son of Philip III of France (b. 1270)
 date unknown
 Amir Khusrow, Persian language poet (b. 1253)
 Francis of Mayrone, French philosopher (b. c. 1280)
 Saint Nikodim I, Serbian archbishop
 Princess Joguk, Korean princess (b. 1308)
 Thomas de Dundee, Bishop of Ross

References